Powerton Lake State Fish and Wildlife Area is a  area of semi-protected habitat on the Illinois River southwest of to the city of Pekin, Illinois within Tazewell County in the U.S. state of Illinois.  The parcel is a cooling reservoir owned by NRG Energy, an electric power generating firm, and is operated by the Illinois Department of Natural Resources (IDNR).  The lake is used for fishing, with an emphasis on blue catfish.  In addition, IDNR states that approximately 60% of the cooling pond is used for duck and goose hunting during legal hunting seasons.  The remaining 40% of the pond is maintained as a waterfowl refuge on a year-round basis.

Description
Powerton Lake is adjacent to the Illinois River.  The low-lying Illinois River’s wetland bed is only partly suitable (at best) for agriculture, and large strips of the riverbank have been used for other purposes.  The Powerton cooling pond is an engineering element of Powerton Station, a 1,538-megawatt coal-fired plant sited adjacent to the southeast shore of the lake.  The power station uses large quantities of water as part of its turbine operations.  Powerton has operated since 1972.
The lake is heavily engineered to protect the power plant and other stretches of lake shoreline.  Three causeway strips extend from the mainland out into the lake. The causeways divide the lake into four separate segments, preventing conditions of wind and storm from building up lake waves and eroding the shoreline.  The Wildlife Area is managed as a disjunct site of the Spring Lake State Fish and Wildlife Area, a separate hunting preserve located near Manito, Illinois.

References

External links
 U.S. Geological Survey Map at the U.S. Geological Survey Map Website. Retrieved January 12, 2023.

Illinois River
Protected areas of Tazewell County, Illinois
State parks of Illinois
Cooling ponds
NRG Energy